Mihael Modić (born 14 January 1998) is a Bosnian professional footballer who plays as a forward for Bosnian Premier League club Krupa.

Career
In 2011, Modić and his brother Andrej, joined the youth academy of Milan, one of Italy's most successful clubs. In 2017, he was sent on loan to Rende in the Italian Serie C.

In 2018, Modić signed with Bosnian Premier League club Krupa.

References

External links

1998 births
Living people
Sportspeople from Banja Luka
Bosnia and Herzegovina footballers
Association football forwards
Association football wingers
Rende Calcio 1968 players
FK Krupa players
Serie C players
Premier League of Bosnia and Herzegovina players
Bosnia and Herzegovina expatriate footballers
Bosnia and Herzegovina expatriate sportspeople in Italy
Expatriate footballers in Italy